Rodolfo "Rudy" Rake (born 13 July 1979) is a former professional tennis player from Peru.

Career
Rake, who was born in Lima, moved to Florida in 1993. He was a top ranking junior in the United States and finished runner-up in the 1997 "18 and Under" Orange Bowl, losing the final to Nicolas Massu.

He received a wildcard to play in the main draw of the 1997 US Open and faced the Czech Republic's Bohdan Ulihrach in the opening round. Rake was beaten in straight sets.

References

1979 births
Living people
Peruvian male tennis players
Sportspeople from Lima
Peruvian expatriates in the United States
20th-century Peruvian people
21st-century Peruvian people